Holly Hill is a neighborhood located in West Columbus, Columbus, Ohio, United States. Holly Hill is a traditional 1960s suburban neighborhood consisting of mostly brick ranch houses and some bi-level houses. Holly Hill is located next to Georgian Heights.

References 

Neighborhoods in Columbus, Ohio